Gibberifera monticola is a species of moth of the family Tortricidae. It is found in China (Sichuan, Yunnan).

The wingspan is 15–17 mm.

References

Moths described in 1971
Eucosmini